Roger M. Tarpy (born 1941) is an American psychologist.

Tarpy is a specialist in the study of learning and memory in both humans and animals. He is best known as the author and editor of text books at the undergraduate and graduate levels in these fields, publishing five distinctive texts between 1975 and 1997. He has also published numerous research papers on topics relating to associative learning in rats, and on learning and motivation in other species including humans. In 1987, he collaborated with Stephen Lea and Paul Webley on a major textbook in economic psychology, The individual in the economy (Cambridge University Press), and, in 1993, with Kelly Shaver on an introductory text called Psychology (Macmillan).

Tarpy graduated from Amherst College in 1963, and then took a master's degree at the College of William and Mary before undertaking his PhD at Princeton University, under the supervision of Byron Campbell. He was an assistant and an associate professor at Williams College, before moving to Bucknell University, Lewisburg, Pennsylvania, where he remained as a professor of Psychology until his retirement in 2001. He also held visiting positions at Durham University, the University of Oxford and the University of Exeter in the UK.

For some time after his retirement, Tarpy wrote a weekly column called Speaking of Behavior that was self-syndicated in a dozen newspapers. His leisure activities include singing (including in a barbershop quartet), and conducting community choruses.

Books authored or edited by Roger M. Tarpy
Basic principles of learning (1975)
Foundations of learning and memory (with Richard E. Mayer) (1978)
Readings in learning and memory (editor, with Richard E. Mayer) (1979)
Principles of animal learning and motivation (1982)
The Individual in the economy (with Stephen E.G. Lea and Paul Webley) (1987)
Psychology (with Kelly G. Shaver) (1993)
Contemporary learning theory and research (1997)

References

21st-century American psychologists
Comparative psychologists
Bucknell University faculty
1941 births
Living people
20th-century American psychologists